Pancreatic secretory granule membrane major glycoprotein GP2 is a protein that in humans is encoded by the GP2 gene.

References

Further reading